Amores verdaderos (English: True Love) is a Mexican telenovela produced by Nicandro Díaz González for Televisa and premiered by Canal de las Estrellas in September 2012. It is based on the Mexican telenovela Amor en custodia, which was produced in 2005 by TV Azteca.

History
Principal photography of Amores verdaderos officially started on July 23, 2012 and concluded on April 30, 2013. It is also the first telenovela to have 3-hour finale presentation with commercials. On September 3, 2012, Canal de las Estrellas started broadcasting Amores verdaderos weeknights at 9:30pm, replacing Abismo de pasión. The last episode was broadcast on May 12, 2013, with La tempestad replacing it the following day.

Univision confirmed a prime-time broadcast of Amores verdaderos on October 10, 2012. On November 7, Univision started broadcasting Amores verdaderos weeknights at 9pm/8c, replacing Abismo de pasión. The last episode was broadcast on July 28, 2013 at 8pm/7c, with La tempestad replacing it the following day.

Series overview

Episodes

Special (2013)

References

External links

Lists of Mexican television series episodes
Lists of Mexican drama television series episodes
Lists of Spanish television series episodes